Banknotes of the Swiss franc are issued by the Swiss National Bank in denominations of 10, 20, 50, 100, 200 and 1,000 Swiss francs.

Between 2016 and 2019, the eighth series (while remaining valid) was being replaced by the ninth series. All banknotes starting from the sixth series are exchangeable; banknotes from the fifth series ceased to be valid (fully demonetised) on 1 May 2000.

History
The first banknotes in Switzerland were issued in 1825 by the Caisse de dépôt of the city of Bern.

During the 19th century the cantons (states) of Switzerland had the right to print their own notes. Following the law of 8 March 1881 the Swiss National Bank had the exclusive right to issue banknotes in Switzerland. Its first notes were issued in 1907. Since then, nine series of Swiss franc notes have been printed, six of which have been completely released for use by the general public, and a new series started being released in 2016.

Switzerland is unusual among affluent countries in that it used to expire its banknotes; the Swiss National Bank has declared several older series of banknotes to be no longer legal tender some time after introducing newer series. Notes from these "recalled" series could be exchanged for still-valid notes at the National Bank for up to 20 years after the date of recall, after which the notes lost all value. When recalled series become valueless, the National Bank transfers an amount of money equal to the sum of the now-worthless notes to a state-run last-resort disaster insurance fund, the Swiss Fund for Aid in Cases of Uninsurable Damage by Natural Forces. In June 2019, the Swiss parliament passed a bill that removed the twenty-year time limit. Effective 1 January 2020, all banknotes starting from the sixth series issued in 1976 as well as any future series remain valid and can be exchanged for current notes indefinitely.

In April 2021, the Swiss National Bank announced that it was recalling its eighth series of banknotes issued between 1995 and 1998; the series was replaced by the ninth series launched between 2016 and 2019. In May 2021, the banknotes lost their status as legal tender and are no longer valid for payments.

Overview

All series of Swiss banknotes

First series

Second series
The second series of Swiss banknotes was issued between 1911 and 1914.

Third series
The third series of Swiss banknotes was printed in 1918; some of the notes were issued as war notes, while others were kept as reserve.

Fourth series
The fourth series of Swiss banknotes was printed in 1938 as a reserve series and was never issued.

Fifth series
The fifth series of Swiss banknotes was issued starting in 1957.

Sixth series

Seventh series
A seventh series of Swiss banknotes was designed and printed in 1984, in parallel with the sixth series, but was never released. It formed the reserve series, to be released, for example, if the current series were suddenly to become widely counterfeited. At first, almost no information was released on the series for security reasons, except for small fragments. However, after the eighth series was released, it was decided to improve the security features of the current series rather than develop a new reserve series. The details of the seventh series were later released, while the actual banknotes were destroyed. The designers were Roger Pfund and Elisabeth Pfund. They had originally won the competition for the design of the sixth series, but since the Swiss National Bank decided to use the design by Ernst and Ursula Hiestand instead, the Pfunds were charged with the design of the reserve series.

Eighth series
The eighth series of Swiss franc banknotes, designed by Jörg Zintzmeyer, entered circulation in 1995. They were withdrawn in 2021.

Ninth series
In 2005, the Swiss National Bank held a competition to determine the design of the next series of banknotes. The competition was won by Manuel Krebs, but his designs, which include depictions of blood cells and embryos, were met with sufficient opposition from the general public as to discourage the bank from going forward with them. As a result, the ninth series of Swiss franc banknotes was based on designs by second place finalist Manuela Pfrunder. The series was scheduled to be issued around 2010 but was delayed to 2015 due to technical problems in the production. The new 50-franc banknote was issued on 12 April 2016, followed by the 20-franc banknote on 17 May 2017, the 10-franc banknote on 18 October 2017, the 200-franc banknote on 22 August 2018, the 1,000-franc banknote on 13 March 2019 and the 100-franc banknote on 12 September 2019.

Security and counterfeiting 

According to the 2008 edition of Guinness World Records, the eighth series of Swiss franc notes is the most secure in the world with up to 18 security features including a tilting digit, which can only be seen from an unusual angle, a UV digit that can only be seen under ultraviolet light and micro text. According to their respective central banks, the rate of counterfeited banknotes as of 2011 was about 1 in 100,000 for the Swiss franc, 1 in 20,000 for the euro, 1 in 10,000 for the United States dollar and 1 in 3,333 for the pound sterling.

See also 
 Coins of the Swiss franc
 Vreneli
Hybrid paper-polymer banknote

Notes and references

Bibliography 
 Michel de Rivaz, The Swiss banknote: 1907–1997, Genoud, 1997.
 Albert Meier, Monnaies – Billets de Banque. Suisse – Liechtenstein 1798–1995, Hünibach, 1996.

External links

 Banknotes and coins (Swiss National Bank)

Switzerland
Economy of Switzerland